The Seven Seas is a book of poetry by Rudyard Kipling published 1896. Poems include "Hymn Before Action", "In the Neolithic Age", "The Lost Legion", "The Mary Gloster", and "McAndrew's Hymn".

References

External links

1896 poetry books
English poetry collections
Poetry by Rudyard Kipling
Works by Rudyard Kipling